The Battle of Kharkiv was a military engagement that took place from February to May 2022 in and around the city of Kharkiv in Ukraine, as part of the northeastern Ukraine offensive and eastern Ukraine offensive during the 2022 Russian invasion of Ukraine.

By 13 May, Ukrainian forces pushed Russian units attempting to encircle the city back towards the Russian border. Additionally, it was reported that Russia had withdrawn units from the area. The Institute for the Study of War opined that Ukraine had "likely won the battle of Kharkiv". However, bombardment continued, and by 20 May, Russian forces were again shelling Kharkiv city. As a result of the subsequent counteroffensive in the Kharkiv Oblast, Russian forces located close to the city were pushed back, resulting in significantly reduced pressure on Kharkiv.

On 12 June, Amnesty International claimed it found the evidence of widespread use of widely-banned cluster munitions by Russia, such as 9N210/9N235 cluster bombs, and "scatterable" munitions that eject small mines that explode later in timed intervals. Four months after the battle, Ukraine launched a major counteroffensive in September to recapture territories that were still under Russian control in Kharkiv Oblast. The significance of the battle and its importance has been compared to the Battle of Saratoga during the American War of Independence.

Battle

Commencement of operations (24–26 February) 
On 24 February, Russian forces amassed in Belgorod crossed the border and began advancing towards Kharkiv, clashing with Ukrainian forces along the way. 
Pavlo Fedosenko, commander of the 92nd Mechanized Brigade, noted that explosions were heard outside his military unit at 4 a.m. Part of the body of forces broke off towards Vovchansk, capturing the city after a short battle and heading south towards Izium. Russian forces began encircling Kharkiv from the north and eastern directions.

By 25 February, fierce fighting had broken out in the northern suburbs of the city, near the village of Tsyrkuny, where Ukrainian forces were able to hold against Russian forces. Russian artillery barrages hit an apartment block in the city, killing a young boy. On 26 February, Oleh Synyehubov, the Ukrainian Governor of Kharkiv Oblast announced a curfew and that non-military vehicles on the street would be "liquidated."

American officials reported that the heaviest fighting of the entire conflict was occurring at Kharkiv.

In the early morning of 27 February, Russian forces destroyed a gas pipeline in Kharkiv.

Fighting in the city (27-28 February) 

On the 27 February, two companies of the Russian 2nd Guards Spetsnaz Brigade entered Kharkiv proper. According to Ukrainian officials, some Russian soldiers attempting to enter the city from the west were stopped at Pisochyn.

The Russian companies were cut off as soon as they had advanced into the city. Ukrainian officials claimed that their forces had destroyed at least 6 GAZ Tigr-Ms, half of Russian military vehicles that had advanced into Kharkiv. Russian Ministry of Defence spokesman Igor Konashenkov  claimed that Russian forces had secured the surrender of the Ukrainian 302nd Anti-Aircraft Missile Regiment and captured 471 Ukrainian soldiers, a claim that Ukrainian officials denied.

A fierce firefight broke out at the School No. 134, where one Russian company was pinned down. Synyehubov reporting that heavy fighting was occurring, and Ministry of Internal Affairs advisor Anton Herashchenko claiming street fighting was underway in the city centre.

On the morning of 28 February, the Russian company broke out and rejoined the main body of Russian forces outside the city. Synyehubov reported that Ukrainian forces had regained full control of the city. He added that dozens of Russian soldiers had surrendered. Fedosenko stated that the Ukrainian forces “drove the Russians out of the city, dug in and that's it.”

Intensified strikes (28 February – 2 April) 
On 28 February, Herashchenko claimed that Russian rocket strikes on the city had killed dozens of civilians, while Synyehubov reported that eleven civilians were killed and dozens wounded, and Ihor Terekhov, the mayor of Kharkiv, reporting that nine civilians were killed and 37 were wounded. One of those killed was a 25-year-old student from Algeria, who was killed by a Russian sniper.

Later on 28 February, Terekhov reported that Russian forces were beginning to destroy electrical substations in Kharkiv, resulting in some areas of the city being disconnected from power, heating and water. He also added that 87 homes had been damaged in Russian shelling. It was also reported that the Malyshev Factory had been destroyed by Russian shelling.

Later on 28 February, Human Rights Watch stated that Russian forces used cluster bombs in the Industrialnyi, Saltivskyi and Shevchenkivskyi districts of the city. Human Rights Watch noted that the use of cluster bombs is prohibited by the 2010 Convention on Cluster Munitions and that their use "might constitute a war crime", due to the threat they pose to civilians.

On the morning of 1 March, a Russian 3M54-1 Kalibr missile struck Freedom Square in central Kharkiv, detonating in front of the Kharkiv Oblast administrative building. The Slovene consulate was destroyed in the blast. An opera house and a concert hall were also damaged. At least 24 people were wounded and 29 were killed, according to the regional administration.

The Biathlon Federation of Ukraine later reported that one of the Ukrainian soldiers killed in Kharkiv on 1 March was Yevgeny Malyshev, a biathlete and former member of the Ukrainian national team.

Later on 1 March, it was reported that an 21-year-old Indian student studying at Kharkiv National Medical University had been killed during Russian shelling. The student was from the village of Chalageri in Karnataka. According to the local Indian student coordinator, he was killed by an airstrike in the morning while he stood in a line-up to buy groceries. Indian authorities later announced they had evacuated all Indian nationals from Kyiv as part of a wider operation. Of the 8,000 Indian students that were still in Ukraine on 1 March, around half were located in Kharkiv and Sumy. A member of the OSCE Special Monitoring Mission to Ukraine, Mayna Fenina, was also killed during shelling on 1 March.

On 2 March, Synyehubov stated that at least 21 people had been killed and 112 wounded in the previous 24 hours. Russian paratroopers landed in Kharkiv and conducted a raid on a Ukrainian military hospital after an aerial assault on the city, leading to heavy clashes between Russian and Ukrainian forces. A local official later claimed that Ukrainian forces still controlled the hospital.

The Kharkiv Police headquarters, a military academy and the National University of Kharkiv were damaged by Russian shelling during the morning. Several residential areas were also struck by Russian missiles. Russian missiles later struck Freedom Square again, damaging the Kharkiv City Council building and the Derzhprom, in addition to some high-rise buildings.

On the night of 2 March, two missiles struck the headquarters of the Kharkiv Territorial Defence Forces. The Assumption Cathedral, which was being used as a shelter by civilians, was also damaged, along with the Catholic Church of St. Anthony. CNN released a report claiming that of all the 16 locations in Kharkiv targeted by Russian shelling that week; only three were non-civilian areas.

The Security Service of Ukraine stated on 6 March that Russian BM-21 Grads were shelling the Kharkiv Institute of Physics and Technology, which houses a nuclear research facility, and warned it could lead to a large-scale ecological disaster. The International Atomic Energy Agency stated the next day that the nuclear research facility had reportedly been damaged but there was no radiation leak. Local emergency officials stated that at least eight civilians had been killed in the shelling on the city overnight. The Azerbaijani consulate in the city was meanwhile severely damaged and the Albanian consulate was demolished.

On 7 March, the Ukrainian Ministry of Defence announced that Ukrainian forces had killed Russian Major General Vitaly Gerasimov, a deputy commander of the 41st Combined Arms Army. This claim later turned out to be untrue, as Gerasimov received the Order of Alexander Nevsky on May 23. Other Russian officers were also killed in the attack. Russian soldiers also killed two civilian volunteers at the Feldman Ecopark as they entered the animals' enclosure to feed them.

On 8 March, Synyehubov stated that more than 600,000 civilians had been evacuated from the city via railways. Ukrainian officials stated that all of Kharkiv was under their control, and that aside from some shelling on the outskirts of the city, no Russian offensive action was being taken.

On 10 March, the State Emergency Service of Ukraine stated that four people, including two children, were killed by Russian shelling in Kharkiv. Russian shelling also destroyed a shopping mall in the centre of the city. Later, Herashchenko claimed that a Russian airstrike had struck the Kharkiv Institute of Physics and Technology.

On 14 March, Russian shelling hit a residential area, killing two civilians and wounding one. The following day, Synyehubov claimed that the city had been shelled 65 times on 14 March, killing a civilian, and that 600 residential buildings had been destroyed in Kharkiv. The following day, Ukraine reported that they had killed Igor Nikolaev, commander of the 252nd Motorized Rifle Brigade, along with around 30% of the regiment's personnel and equipment.

On 16 March, Ukrainian officials claimed that three civilians were killed and five were wounded when Russian forces shelled a market.

On 18 March, Kharkiv Regional Prosecutor's Office reported shelling of residential buildings in Slobidskyi and Moskovskyi districts of the city. In addition, the building of the Institute of State Administration of the National Academy for Public Administration was partially ruined. Russian shelling of Saltivka killed 96-year-old Boris Romanchenko, who survived four Nazi concentration camps and was engaged in preserving the memory of the crimes of Nazism.

On 19 March, Oleh Synyehubov, the appointed head of the Kharkiv Regional Civil-Military Administration (HOVA), stated that the northern suburbs of Kharkiv had been under constant bombardment and that the city centre was being struck by shells and rockets. He claimed that numerous administrative and cultural buildings had been damaged and destroyed. He also stated that Ukrainian forces had counter-attacked, pushing Russian forces away from the outskirts of the city.

On 24 March, a Russian airstrike hit a Nova Poshta office, killing six civilians and injuring at least 15. On 26 March, Russian shells damaged a monument at the Drobytsky Yar Holocaust memorial.

On 28 March, Kharkiv Mayor Ihor Terekhov said that about 30% of city's residents had left Kharkiv since the onset of the war. Head of HOVA, military governor Oleh Synyehubov, reported that Russians had again hit city neighbourhoods with cluster munitions. He also claimed that in several directions Ukrainian fighters had counterattacked and that they had cleared the enemy from Mala Rohan and Vilkhivka.

Meanwhile, the Russians claimed to have killed, on the same day, more than 100 "extremists and mercenaries" from Western countries in Kharkiv with a high-precision Iskander missile strike on a defense base.

Russian bypass (April) 
On 2 April, according to Synyehubov, the Russians were bypassing Izyum to continue to the Luhansk and Donetsk regions.
On 3 April 2022, the Ukrainian government stated that two Russian soldiers had been killed and 28 others hospitalised after Ukrainian civilians handed out poisoned cakes to Russian soldiers of the Russian 3rd Motor Rifle Division in Kharkiv.

Despite limited Russian withdrawals to the north of the city and the Ukrainian forcing of the road to Chuhuiv, on 4 April, the Ukraine's defence ministry warned that the invaders were preparing to launch a new assault to take the city from the east.

Russian shelling of Kharkiv between 14 and 17 April left 18 civilians dead and 106 wounded.

On 17 April, Synyehubov claimed on Telegram that the villages of Bazaliyivka, Lebyazhe and part of Kutuzivka were retaken in a Ukrainian counteroffensive, and that forces had advanced to near the village of Mala Rohan. In addition, he stated that Ukrainian forces had destroyed five tanks and ten armored vehicles "by jet fire" and had killed or captured 100 Russian soldiers.

On 27 April, Kharkiv remained partially encircled. On 29 April, Synyehubov said that since the war started, more than 2,000 buildings in the city were either damaged or destroyed. He also said that on 28 April, due to almost non-stop shelling, five civilians were killed. Also on 29 April it was reported that the village Ruska Lozova, near Kharkiv, was retaken by Ukraine.

Ukrainian counteroffensive (1–13 May) 
In May 2022, Ukrainian forces began a counter-offensive to drive Russian forces out of the city and towards the international border. By 12 May, the United Kingdom Ministry of Defense reported that Russia had withdrawn units from the Kharkiv area.

On 2 May, the Institute for the Study of War (ISW) reported that Ukraine retook the village of Staryi Saltiv, 40 km east of the city.

On 6 May, the ISW described a Ukrainian counteroffensive "along a broad arc" north and east of Kharkiv, reporting that Ukraine had recaptured "several villages," including Tsyrkuny, Peremoha and part of Cherkaski Tyshky. The ISW speculated that Ukraine "may successfully push Russian forces out of artillery range of Kharkiv in the coming days." On 7 May, Ukrainian forces reported that five villages northeast of Kharkiv had been retaken. Quoting a Ukrainian official, The New York Times said that the battle for Kharkiv was not over, but that at the moment, Ukraine was dominating. The advance north and east, made mainly by the 92nd Mechanized Brigade and the 93rd Mechanized Brigade, forced the Russian forces to retreat across the Donets river while blowing the bridges behind them.

On 10 May, Ukrainian forces claimed to have recaptured four settlements. This counteroffensive, if successful, could bring Ukrainian forces within several kilometres of the Russian border.

By 13 May, the ISW opined that Ukraine had "likely won the battle of Kharkiv". The Mayor of Kharkiv said to the BBC: "There was no shelling in the city for the last five days. There was only one attempt from Russians to hit the city with a missile rocket near Kharkiv airport, but the missile was eliminated by Ukrainian Air Defence."

Continued fighting, September counteroffensive and Russian retreat 

After the Ukrainian counteroffensive, Russian forces were driven back to defensive positions, some of which were within miles of the Russia-Ukraine international border. Despite this, they continued to shell various Kharkiv suburbs, as well as the city proper, killing numerous civilians and wounding dozens more.

On 20 May, Russian forces again shelled several villages in the Kharkiv district, including the city of Kharkiv itself, using BM-21 Grad, BM-27 Uragan and BM-30 Smerch multiple rocket launchers.

On 21 May, in a statement the Ukrainian police confirmed the recovery of the bodies of six military officials, including a Russian colonel, in the settlement of Zolochiv.

On 20 June, new rocket strikes destroyed Housing and Communal College of Kharkiv National University of Urban Economy and a depot of Kharkiv Metro. On 24 June, sports complex of Kharkiv Polytechnic Institute was destroyed.

On 3 July, the Russian defence ministry claimed an airstrike struck a forward position of the Territorial Defence Forces' 127th Separate Brigade, neutralizing 100 Ukrainian troops and destroying "15 units of military equipment." This claim was not independently verified at the time.

On 4 July, new missile strike ruined a gymnasium. On 6 July, Russian shelling destroyed one of the buildings at Kharkiv National Pedagogical University and a former manor house and architectural monument built in 1832.

On 20 July, at least three people were killed in the morning as a result of a Russian missile attack on Kharkiv, including a 13-year-old boy.

On 17–18 August, 25 people were killed and several dozen were injured in a missile strike on two dormitories. Also on 18 August, new Russian strike destroyed Palace of culture of railroad workers.

19 August was proclaimed a day of mourning in the city for people killed in the preceding days. The same day, new rocket strike destroyed one of buildings of Kharkiv Polytechnic Institute, killing one person.

On 2 September 2022, a missile strike damaged Lokomotyv Sports Palace.

On 6 September 2022, Ukrainian forces launched a major counteroffensive. 
Three days later, Ukrainian troops liberated Izyum, Balakliia and other settlements.
Between 6–11 September alone, the Ukrainians claimed to have killed 2,850 Russian soldiers and to have destroyed up to 590 pieces of military equipment, including 86 tanks, 158 armoured combat vehicles, 106 artillery systems, 159 vehicles and 46 other equipment systems. According to Oryx, they also captured an additional 129 pieces of military equipment.

On 11 September, Russian army shelled infrastructure facilities in central and eastern Ukraine, including Kharkiv TEC-5 and Zmiiv thermal power station in Kharkiv region. This caused extensive power outages in 5 regions of Ukraine and is thought to be the response to the Ukrainian counteroffensive.

Casualties

Civilian casualties 
During the battle, at least 606 civilians were killed due to Russian shelling and fighting for the city. Due to the fog of war, it is impossible to tabulate total casualties for the Battle of Kharkiv. Additionally, various skirmishes around Kharkiv's suburbs have led to casualties for both the Russian and Ukrainian Armed Forces.

Military casualties 
Like the civilian death toll, the true number of military casualties is impossible to estimate due to the fog of war and opposing governments' inflation or deflation of numbers in order to boost morale.

During the course of the battle, the Ukrainian government claimed to have killed over 2,400 Russian troops. On 3 March, Ukraine claimed to have destroyed a 120-man unit of airborne soldiers. On 26 March, Ukraine claimed to have killed 645 soldiers from a single unit with only three men surviving, of whom two were wounded. 30 units of military equipment were also destroyed, including armored vehicles and trucks. On 29 March, Ukraine claimed to have completely destroyed 2 battalion tactical groups from the 200th Separate Motor Rifle Brigade, and inflicted casualties on others, killing up to 1,500 soldiers. On 30 May, the Ukrainians repatriated the bodies of 62 Russian servicemen in the Kharkiv Region.

The Russian government, on the other hand, gave very sparse updates as to Ukrainian casualties but claimed to have killed up to 276 Ukrainian fighters by 2 April, including 130 mercenaries, although this number is likely much higher due to the irregularity of Russian updates.

War crimes 
On 13 June, Amnesty International published a report saying that Russian forces had carried out a "relentless campaign of indiscriminate bombardments" in the battle, including the use of banned cluster munitions, scatterable land mines, and Grad rockets. Amnesty stated that these attacks constituted war crimes and potentially represented deliberate targeting of civilians.

See also 
Russian occupation of Kharkiv Oblast

References 

 
Kharkiv
Kharkiv
February 2022 events in Ukraine
March 2022 events in Ukraine
April 2022 events in Ukraine
May 2022 events in Ukraine
2020s in Kharkiv
Articles containing video clips
Use of cluster munition during the Russian invasion of Ukraine